The term set piece or set play is used in association football and rugby football to refer to a situation when the ball is returned to open play, for example following a stoppage, particularly in a forward area of the pitch. In association football, the term usually refers to free kicks and corners, but sometimes penalties and throw-ins. Many goals result from such positions, whether scored directly or indirectly. Thus defending set pieces is an important skill for defenders, and attacking players spend much time practicing them; set pieces are one area where tactics and routines can be worked out in training in advance of matches. Some players specialize in set pieces.

References

Association football terminology
Association football tactics
American football terminology
Rugby league terminology
Rugby union terminology